The greyish miner (Geositta maritima) is a species of bird in the family Furnariidae. It is found in Chile and Peru. Its natural habitat is subtropical or tropical dry shrubland.

References

greyish miner
Birds of Chile
Birds of Peru
greyish miner
Taxonomy articles created by Polbot
Taxa named by Frédéric de Lafresnaye
Taxa named by Alcide d'Orbigny